Serpenticobitis, popularly known as serpent loaches, is a small genus of loaches found in the Mekong River Basin in Southeast Asia.  It is the only genus in the family Serpenticobitidae.

Species
 Serpenticobitis cingulata T. R. Roberts, 1997
 Serpenticobitis octozona T. R. Roberts, 1997
 Serpenticobitis zonata Kottelat, 1998

References

Serpenticobitidae
Fish of Asia